Dario Romano (born 15 November 1971) is an Italian judoka form Cercola, in province of Naples.

Achievements

References
Factfile on JudoInside.com

1971 births
Living people
Italian male judoka
Mediterranean Games gold medalists for Italy
Mediterranean Games medalists in judo
Competitors at the 1997 Mediterranean Games